Burhan Sargun (born 11 February 1929) is a Turkish former footballer. He was born in Ankara.

During his club career he played for Fenerbahçe between 1951–56 and 1960–61, scoring a total of 112 goals. He played 8 games and scored 7 goals for the Turkey national football team, including a hat-trick in the 1954 FIFA World Cup against South Korea.

References

1929 births
Living people
Footballers from Ankara
Turkish footballers
Fenerbahçe S.K. footballers
1954 FIFA World Cup players
Turkey international footballers
Turkey under-21 international footballers
Association football forwards